James Jerpe (1885 – January 16, 1917) was an American sports writer and columnist, writing for The Pittsburgh Dispatch, The Pittsburgh Post and The Gazette Times from 1909 until 1916.

Early life and career 
In 1985, Jerpe was born in Pittsburgh's Lawrenceville district to Swedish émigré Andrew H. Jerpe and his second-generation Swedish-American spouse Anna Stomberg. When his parents moved to Norfolk, Ohio in 1900, James remained behind and soon found work as a copy boy with a local paper. By no later than 1907 he was employed as a reporter, and between 1909 and 1911, he wrote for The Pittsburgh Dispatch and The Pittsburgh Post. Beginning in January 1912 and continuing through roughly September 1916, Jerpe's byline appeared on a much more regular basis in what would prove his final and, by far, best-remembered incarnation, as columnist and Pirates beat writer for The Gazette Times.

In 1915, during the Pirates' first east coast trip, Jerpe first complained of having difficulty seeing plays on the field. On his doctor's recommendation, he took a brief leave of absence, but within weeks, Jerpe had become completely blind. Notwithstanding this sudden and disheartening development, Jerpe continued to provide his column, "On and Off the Field" (and later "Sport-itorials"), as well as other featured articles until deteriorating health forced him to bow out altogether in September 1916.

Personal life 
In March 1908, Jerpe married Eva J. Thompson, with whom he had two children. In October 1960, their grandson, Andrew F. Jerpe, gained some measure of notoriety as the 14-year-old who, while making a slightly premature exit from Forbes Field just prior to the conclusion of Game 7 of the 1960 World Series, retrieved Bill Mazeroski's Series-ending home run ball.

Death
At 9 A.M. on Tuesday morning, January 16, 1917, not quite 5 months after his retirement, Jerpes finally succumbed to his nearly 2-year-long illness. His funeral, held on January 19, attracted many friends and colleagues, including representatives of the Gazette-Times, the Police and Fire Departments, and the Pitsburgh Stove League. In accordance with Jerpe's last wishes, his favorite musical selection, John McCormack's 1916 recording of "Beautiful Isle of Somewhere," was played during the funeral service.

References

Further reading

Articles 

 Gazette Times staff (September 4, 1907). "Cawley is faced by Citizens". Pittsburgh Gazette Times. p. 2
 Jerpe, James (March 21, 1909). "Pittsburgh Man Perfects an Auto Fire Engine". The Pittsburgh Post. p. 29
 Jerpe, James (December 7, 1912). "Uniform Scoring Rules Should Be Drawn Soon; Old Fielder's Choice Remains Unsettled"
 Jerpe, James (December 21, 1912). "Wagner's Habit of Eating When He Pleases Helps Him" Newark Evening Star. p. 9
 Jerpe, James (January 12, 1913). "Hans Wagner is 'Youngest' of Major League Veterans". The Birmingham Age-Herald. p. 14
 Special Correspondence (February 8, 1913). "Pittsburgh Activities: Brisbane Addresses the Traffic Club and F. Hopkinson Smith the Engineers". Editor and Publisher. p. 6
 "New Sporting Writers' Association". The Fourth Estate. February 15, 1913. p. 15.
 Jackson, Joe S. (April 10, 1913). "Giving Credit to Base Runners". The Sporting News. p. 4
 Keener, Sid C. (June 6, 1913). "Scribe Says Cobb Will Be Traded to the Pirates". The Miami Herald. p. 5
 Keeler, O. B. (January 18, 1914). "Nap Rucker Greatest Southpaw; Such Is Verdict of Expert Jury; Eleven Noted Sporting Editors Vote, and Six Award the Title to Georgian". Hearst's Sunday American. p. 13
 Batchelor, E. A.; Vaughan, Irving; O'Connor, W.J.; Peet, Bill; Jerpe, James (March 1, 1914). "'Black Jack' Barry Is Best Shortstop". The Salt Lake Tribune. p. 41
 Jerpe, James (January 28, 1915). "Here and There with the Fans". The Sporting News. p. 5
 Jerpe, James (February 3, 1915). "Wagner Not Tempted by Offers of Cash; His Salary Is All the Star Ever Accepted". The Wilmington Evening Journal. p. 12
 Lanigan, H.W. (March 12, 1915). "Pittsburg Here Next Monday; First Game Will Be Played at Whittington Park Wednesday". The Hot Springs Sentinel-Record. p. 2
 Jerpe, James (May 21, 1915). "On and Off the Field: The Two-Edged Alibi". The Pittsburgh Gazette-Times. p. 9
 Jerpe, James (September 19, 1915). "Cravath Needs Only Three More Home Runs to Equal High Mark Set by Buck Freeman". The Pittsburgh Gazette Times. p. 19
 Jerpe, James (October 2, 1915). "Police and Firemen Form Football Team". The Pittsburgh Gazette Times. p. 10 
 Jerpe, James (January 9, 1916). "Jimmy Callahan Pulls Nautical Joke on Tourists". The Omaha Sunday Bee. p. 3—S
 Rowland, Leslie W. (April 30, 1916). "Baseball Scribe's Home Cheered by Stars' Party". The Pittsburgh Gazette Times. p. 21
 Gazette staff (June 8, 1916). "Batsmen Cast a Confirming Vote". The York Gazette. p. 6
 Jerpe, James (June 18, 1916). "Evers Analyzes Both Major Leagues". The Pittsburgh Gazette Times. p. 21 
 Ballinger, Ed (January 25, 1917). "Jim Jerpe Pens His Last Story for Fans. The Sporting News. p. 5
 Monitoren staff (February 9, 1917). "Allehanda Nytt". Svenska Monitoren. p. 5
 Star staff (February 19, 1917). "Optimism in Blindness". The Kansas City Star. p. 8
 Mathewson, Christy (April 21, 1917). "Big League Gossip". The Evening World. p. 6.
 Lanigan, Ernest (April 30, 1931). "Fanning with Lanigan". The Sporting News. p. 4
 Long, James J. (February 2, 1939). "Chilly Doyle, New BBWA Prexy, Red-Hot Fan Who Rejoices and Suffers Over Pirate Fortunes". The Sporting News. p. 10
 Mercer, Sid (February 17, 1944). "Earlier Scribes Carried Bags of Gags; By-Liners Among Main-Liners". The Sporting News. p. 5
 Keck, Harry (October 25, 1939). "Sports: A Quarter Century of Sport Reporting". Pittsburgh Sun-Telegraph. p. 20
 Rimmel, William R. (March 31, 1962). "The Shifting Scene". Pittsburgh Post-Gazette. p. 19
 Dugo, Harry (February 12, 1970). "The Independents: Miz Dart Hits Memory Target". Pittsburgh Post-Gazette. p. 30

Books 
 Menke, Frank Grant (1947). The New Encyclopedia of Sports. New York : A. S. Barnes. p. 418. 
 Armstrong, Richard C.; Healy Jr., Martin (2020). George "Mooney" Gibson: Canadian Catcher for Deadball Era Pirates. Jefferson, NC : McFarland & Company, Inc., Publishers. p. 136. .

External links
 John McCormack – "Beautiful Isle of Somewhere" (the recording that was played—in accordance with his last wishes—at Jerpe's funeral); at YouTube

1885 births
1917 deaths
Baseball writers
Blind writers
Sportspeople from Pittsburgh
Sportswriters from Pennsylvania
Writers from Pittsburgh
American people of Swedish descent
American Presbyterians
20th-century American non-fiction writers
Burials at Allegheny Cemetery